Jandira is a municipality in the state of São Paulo in Brazil. It is part of the Metropolitan Region of São Paulo. The population is 126,356 (2020 est.) in an area of 17.45 km². The suburban city is served by the CPTM with line 8.

References

External links 
  http://www.jandira.sp.gov.br
  Jandira on citybrazil.com.br 

Municipalities in São Paulo (state)